The River Eden is a river in Fife in Scotland, and is one of Fife's two principal rivers, along with the Leven.

The source of the Eden is either at the confluence of the two burns (streams), named the Carmore and the Beatie, across the A91 road from  the hamlet of Burnside, near the border with Perth & Kinross, or further upstream the Carmore near the M90 motorway. In the latter case, this first two-mile stretch of the Eden (before Burnside) forms part of the border between Fife and Perth & Kinross.

From Burnside, the Eden slowly flows across the Howe of Fife (a flat and waterlogged basin drained in the 18th and 19th centuries) through the village of Strathmiglo, and then the market town of Cupar to Guardbridge, where it enters the North Sea via the Eden Estuary, a nature reserve and an important conservation area for wading birds. The river holds a good stock of wild brown trout and hosts a fair run of sea trout and Atlantic salmon.

In previous centuries, its water was used to power mills on its banks, and there was a paper mill at Guardbridge until July 2008.

The Eden Estuary is a Local Nature Reserve (LNR) and, along with the Firth of Tay, was designated a Ramsar site on 28 July 2000.

Both estuaries host a variety of recreational activities. The Eden estuary, being significantly smaller than the Tay, has few boating opportunities, but is an important recreation site for birdwatchers and naturalists, foreshore shellfish collectors, fishing enthusiasts and wildfowlers.

References

Ramsar sites in Scotland
Eden, Fife